Hasadah Union is a union parishad situated at Jibannagar Upazila,  in Chuadanga District, Khulna Division of Bangladesh. There are 12 villages and 9 mouzas in the union.

References

External links
 

Unions of Khulna Division
Unions of Chuadanga District
Unions of Jibannagar Upazila